This was a new event on the 2013 ITF Women's Circuit.

Anna-Lena Friedsam won the title, defeating Yuliya Beygelzimer in the final, 4–6, 6–3, 6–3.

Seeds

Main draw

Finals

Top half

Bottom half

References 
 Main draw

Trabzon Cup (2) - Singles
Trabzon Cup
2013 in Turkish tennis